Adrian High School is a public high school located in Adrian, Minnesota, United States and part of the Adrian School District (ISD #511).
 Students from grades K12 are all housed in the same building, with classes for each level being held in different wings of the building. Grades 68 are defined as middle school and 912 as high school.

References

External links
Adrian High School

Public high schools in Minnesota
Schools in Nobles County, Minnesota
Public middle schools in Minnesota
Public elementary schools in Minnesota